Macon may refer to:

Places

Belgium
Macon, Belgium

France
Mâcon
Ancient Diocese of Mâcon
Mâcon, another name for the Mâconnais wine from that region

United States of America
Macon, Alabama
Macon, Georgia
Macon, Illinois
Macon, Mississippi
Macon, Missouri
Macon, Nebraska
Macon, North Carolina
Macon, Tennessee
Bayou Macon, a river in Arkansas and Louisiana
Fort Macon State Park, North Carolina
Battle of Fort Macon
Macon County (disambiguation)
Macon Township (disambiguation)

U.S. Navy ships
, an airship built in 1933
, a cruiser built in 1945

People
Macon (surname)

Colleges
Randolph-Macon College, a private liberal arts college in Ashland, Virginia
Macon State College, a former four-year state college unit of the University System of Georgia
Randolph-Macon Academy (R-MA), a coeducational college preparatory school for students in grades 6–12 and postgraduates in Front Royal, Virginia, USA

Railways

Covington and Macon Railroad began operations in 1887 between Macon and Hillsboro, Georgia, USA
Macon and Northern Railway (169 km) of track between Macon and Athens, Georgia, USA

Other
A symmetric type of oar used in the sport of rowing
Macon (food), a bacon substitute
Macon Library, a branch library in Brooklyn, New York
A variant spelling of Mahound
Macon, first half of the double-album Macon, Georgia by Jason Aldean
Macón (horse), an Argentinian racehorse
Ma-con, a German racing team

See also

 The Baby of Mâcon, 1993 film by Peter Greenaway
 Mâcon Treasure,  a Roman silver hoard found in the city of Mâcon, eastern France in 1764
 Masson (disambiguation)
 Mason (disambiguation)